Ellis Ferreira (born 19 February 1970) is a former professional male tennis player from South Africa. He played collegiately at the University of Alabama, earning all-SEC and all-American honors. Ferreira competed at the 1996 Summer Olympics in men's doubles with Wayne Ferreira (to whom he is unrelated). He won two Grand Slam doubles titles, the Men's title at the 2000 Australian Open with Rick Leach and the mixed doubles at the Australian Open with Corina Morariu in 2001. Ferreira was named the Senior Assistant Men's and Women's Tennis Head Coach at Washington College in Chestertown, Maryland, in July 2007. Ferreira is now the co-owner of the Eagleton/ Ferreira Tennis Academy on Longboat Key in Florida.

Career finals

Doubles (18 titles, 15 runner-ups)

Doubles performance timeline

References

External links
 
 
 

1970 births
Living people
South African male tennis players
Alabama Crimson Tide men's tennis players
Australian Open (tennis) champions
Tennis players at the 1996 Summer Olympics
Grand Slam (tennis) champions in mixed doubles
Grand Slam (tennis) champions in men's doubles
South African people of Portuguese descent
White South African people
Olympic tennis players of South Africa